William M. Ivins may refer to:

 William Mills Ivins Sr., reformer, mayoral candidate 
 William Mills Ivins Jr., curator of prints department at the Metropolitan Museum of Art, New York